Richard Bromley (born 23 June 1946) is an English cricketer. He played five first-class matches for Cambridge University Cricket Club in 1970.

See also
 List of Cambridge University Cricket Club players

References

External links
 

1946 births
Living people
English cricketers
Cambridge University cricketers
People from Oxted